Caio Vinícius da Conceição (born 11 January 1999), known as Caio Vinícius or simply Caio, is a Brazilian footballer who plays as a defensive midfielder

Career statistics

References

External links

1999 births
Living people
Footballers from São Paulo (state)
Brazilian footballers
Association football midfielders
Campeonato Brasileiro Série A players
Campeonato Brasileiro Série B players
Londrina Esporte Clube players
Fluminense FC players
Atlético Clube Goianiense players
Oeste Futebol Clube players
Goiás Esporte Clube players